Dr. Ambedkar Stadium is a football stadium in New Delhi, India. The stadium is named in honour of Dr. B. R. Ambedkar, famous social reformer and architect of the Indian Constitution. It was earlier known as 
the Corporation Stadium. It also held competitions like Delhi Football League, DCM Trophy, Subroto Cup and Durand Cup. It houses offices of Football Delhi, earlier known as Delhi Soccer Association. It was renovated and reopened in 2007 and has a listed capacity of 35,000. The stadium has hosted international football finals such as the 2007 and 2009 Nehru Cup.

In October 2022, I-League side Rajasthan United announced that they will use Ambedkar Stadium as home ground due to unavailability of prominent stadium in their state.

History

Renovation

In 2007, the stadium was renovated and floodlights were installed. In August 2007 the stadium hosted its first tournament under floodlights, the Nehru Cup International Football Tournament 2007.

Controversy
At the start of the 2010–11 I-League season Indian Arrows were expected to play its I-League matches at the stadium, but due to the stadium owners, the Municipal Corporation of Delhi (MCD), holding non-sporting events on the pitch the pitch forced Arrows to play their matches at the Tau Devi Lal Stadium in Gurgaon.

Major matches

See also
 List of football stadiums in India

References

Football venues in Delhi
Multi-purpose stadiums in India
Sports venues in Delhi
Indian Arrows FC
Buildings and structures in New Delhi
2007 establishments in Delhi
Sports venues completed in 2007